Asta Sofie Amalie Nielsen  (11 September 1881 – 24 May 1972) was a Danish silent film actress who was one of the most popular leading ladies of the 1910s and one of the first international movie stars. Seventy of Nielsen's 74 films were made in Germany where she was known simply as Die Asta (The Asta).

Known for her large dark eyes, mask-like face and boyish figure, Nielsen most often portrayed strong-willed passionate women trapped by tragic circumstances. Due to the erotic nature of her performances, Nielsen's films were censored in the United States, and her work remained relatively obscure to American audiences. She is credited with transforming movie acting from overt theatricality to a more subtle naturalistic style.

Nielsen founded her own film studio in Berlin during the 1920s, but returned to Denmark in 1937 after the rise of Nazism in Germany. A private figure in her later years, Nielsen became a collage artist and an author.

Early life 
Asta Sofie Amalie Nielsen was born in the Vesterbro district of Copenhagen, Denmark, the daughter of Jens Christian Nielsen (1847–1895), an often unemployed blacksmith, and Ida Frederikke Petersen (1843–1912), a washerwoman. She had an older sister, Johanne, who suffered from rheumatic fever throughout her life. Nielsen's family moved several times during her childhood while her father sought employment. They lived for several years in Malmö, Sweden, where her father worked at a corn mill and then a factory. After he lost those jobs, they returned to live in the Copenhagen neighborhood of Nørrebro. Nielsen's father died when she was fourteen years old. At the age of 18, Nielsen was accepted into the acting school of the Royal Danish Theatre. During her time there, she studied closely with Royal Danish Actor Peter Jerndorff. In 1901, 21-year-old Nielsen became pregnant and gave birth to a daughter, Jesta. Nielsen never revealed the father's identity, but chose to raise her child alone with the help of her mother and older sister. Jesta committed suicide in 1964.

Nielsen graduated from the Theater school in 1902. For the next three years she worked at the Dagmar Theatre, then toured in Norway and Sweden from 1905 to 1907 with De Otte and the Peter Fjelstrup companies. Returning to Denmark, she was employed at Det Ny Theater from 1907 to 1910. Although she worked steadily as a stage actress, her performances remained unremarkable. Danish historian Robert Neiiendam wrote that Nielsen's unique physical attraction, which was of great value on the screen, was limited on stage by her deep and uneven speaking voice.

Film career 

Nielsen began her film career in 1909, starring in director Urban Gad's 1910 tragedy Afgrunden ("The Abyss"). Nielsen's minimalist acting style was evidenced in her successful portrayal of a naive young woman lured into a tragic life. Her overt sexuality in the film's "gaucho dance" scene established the erotic quality for which Nielsen became known. Because of the film's success, Nielsen continued to act in cinema rather than on stage. Nielsen and Gad married, then made four more films together. The explosion of Nielsen's popularity propelled Gad and Nielsen to move from Denmark to Germany where she was provided her own film studio and the opportunity for greater profits.

In Germany, Nielsen formed a contract with German producer Paul Davidson, who founded the Internationale Film-Vertriebs-Gesellschaft in conjunction with Nielsen and Gad. The company held the European rights on all Nielsen films and Nielsen became a "scintillating international film star", known simply as Die Asta (The Asta), with an annual fee of 85,000 marks in 1914 alone.

Davidson described Nielsen as the decisive factor for his move to film productions:
"I had not been thinking about film production. But then I saw the first Asta Nielsen film. I realised that the age of short film was past. And above all I realised that this woman was the first artist in the medium of film. Asta Nielsen, I instantly felt could be a global success. It was international film sales that provided Union with eight Nielsen films per year. I built her a studio in Tempelhof, and set up a big production staff around her. This woman can carry it ... Let the films cost whatever they cost. I used every available means – and devised many new ones – in order to bring the Asta Nielsen films to the world."

Nielsen contracted for $80,000 a year, then the highest salary for a film star. Nielsen is called the first international movie star, challenged only by French comic Max Linder, also famous throughout Europe and in America by that time. In a Russian popularity poll of 1911, Nielsen was voted the world's top female movie star, behind Linder and ahead of her Danish compatriot Valdemar Psilander.  Her film 'A Militant Suffragette'  was disrupted at a showing in the Queen's Cinema, Aberdeen, Scotland on 4 February 1914, by local suffragists objecting to the portrayal of force-feeding. However she remained popular on both sides through World War I and in 1915 (before the United States' entry into it) she visited New York City to study American film techniques. However, she departed Germany after a mob on the Unter den Linden mistook her for a Russian at the beginning of the war.

In 1921, Nielsen, through her own film distribution company of Asta Films, appeared in the Svend Gade and Heinz Schall directed Hamlet. The film was a radical interpretation of William Shakespeare's play, with Nielsen playing the role of Hamlet as a woman who disguises herself as a man.

Several sources, including IMDb, state that Nielsen played Mata Hari in an early-1920s film variously titled Mata Hari, Die Spionin ('The Spy'). However, scholarly works such as the authoritative filmography published by Filmarchiv Austria in 2010 make no mention of such a film. Film scholar Ivo Blom has concluded that the idea of Nielsen playing Mata Hari on film arose from a confusion with her now-lost film Die Tänzerin Navarro (1922), which features a plot similar to the story of Mata Hari's life.

In 1925, she starred in the German film Die freudlose Gasse (The Joyless Street or The Street of Sorrow), directed by G.W. Pabst and co-starring Greta Garbo, months before Garbo left for Hollywood and MGM.

She worked in German films until the start of sound movies. Nielsen made only one feature movie with sound, Unmögliche Liebe (Crown of Thorns) in 1932. However, the new technical developments in cinema were not suitable to Nielsen's style, nor could her maturity compete with the young American ingenues, so she retired from the screen. Thereafter, Nielsen acted only on stage. After the rise of Nazism she was offered her own studio by propaganda minister Joseph Goebbels. Nielsen later described being invited to tea with Adolf Hitler, who tried to convince her to return to film and explained the political power of her on-screen presence. Understanding the implications, Nielsen declined and left Germany in 1936. She returned home to Denmark where she wrote articles on art and politics and a two-volume autobiography.

She is considered to be a great movie actress because of her natural performing style, adapting to the demands of the film media and avoiding theatrical dramatization. She was also adept at portraying women from varying social strata as well as of different psychologies.

Assistance to Jews during World War II 
During the Second World War, she provided money for Allan O. Hagedorff, a young Dane living in Germany, to assist Jews. Using money provided by Nielsen, Hagedorff sent so many food parcels to the Theresienstadt Ghetto that he was warned by the Gestapo. Among others, Victor Klemperer, the diarist and philologist, was offered money by Hagedorff.

Relationships and death 
Nielsen had four extended relationships and was divorced twice. In 1912, she married the Danish film director Urban Gad following their move together to Germany in 1911 to build their own film studio. They were divorced by 1919 when Nielsen married the Swedish shipbuilder Freddy Windgårdh. This marriage was shorter, ending in divorce in 1923. Nielsen fell in love with the Russian actor Gregori Chmara whom she met through their mutual friend Georg Brandes. They began a long-term common-law marriage that lasted from 1923 until 1936. Nielsen began a relationship in the late 1960s with Danish art collector Christian Theede, whom she had met through dealings of her own artwork. In 1970, at the age of 88, Nielsen married the 77-year-old Theede. Nielsen and Theede's happiness at marrying at an advanced age was celebrated in the world press. Nielsen died at the age of 90 on 25 May 1972 at Frederiksberg Hospital.

Quotes about Asta Nielsen

Legacy 

Belgian Paul van Ostaijen included the expressionistic poem "Asta Nielsen", a paean to Nielsen's sensuousness, in his 1921 collection Bezette Stad (Occupied City).

Joachim Ringelnatz, who was a frequent guest at Nielsens' home, wrote the poems "Über Asta Nielsen" (About Asta Nielsen) - for his 1928 collection Reisebriefe eines Artisten (An Artist's Travel Letters)  - and "Asta Nielsen weiht einen Pokal" (Asta Nielsen Dedicates a Trophy) in 1929.

Filmography 

 1910: Afgrunden (The Abyss) (short)
 1911:  (short, missing)
 1911:  (missing)
 1911:  (eng. The Black Dream)
 1911:  (short) (eng. At the Big Moment)
 1911:  (eng. Ballet Dancers)
 1911:  (eng. The Alien Bird)
 1911: The Traitress (fragments preserved)
 1912:  (missing) (eng. The Power of Gold)
 1912:  (missing) (eng. Rushing to Death)
 1912: Poor Jenny (short)
 1912: The Dance of Death (short, fragment)
 1912:  (missing) (eng. The General's Children)
 1912:  (fragments preserved) (eng. When the Mask is Gone)
 1912:  (short) (eng. The Girl without a Homeland)
 1912: Jugend und Tollheit (short, missing) (eng. Youth and Craziness)
 1913:  (short, missing) (eng. Comedians)
 1913:  (eng. The Sins of the Fathers)
 1913:  (short) (eng. Death in Sevilla)
 1913:  (fragments preserved) (eng. The Suffragette)
 1913: Die Filmprimadonna (short, fragments preserved) (eng. The Prima Donna of Film)
 1914: Little Angel
 1914:  (eng. The Child Calls)
 1914: Zapata's Gang (short)
 1914:  (eng. The Fire)
 1915: Fräulein Feldwebel (short) (eng. Miss Sergeant)
 1915:  (eng. The Daughter of the Country Road)
 1915: The False Asta Nielsen
 1916:  (eng. Eternal Night) 
 1916:  (missing) (eng. Little Angel's Wedding)
 1916: Frontstairs and Backstairs
 1916: Dora Brandes
 1916: The ABC of Love
 1916: Cinderella (missing)
 1916: Das Versuchskaninchen (short) (eng. The Guinea Pig)
 1917: The White Roses (produced 1914–1915)
 1917: Die Brüder (eng. The Brothers)
 1917:  (eng. The Child of the Orphanage)
 1918:  (produced 1916) (eng. Inside the Fuss of Life)
 1918: Rose of the Wilderness (produced 1916)
 1918: The Eskimo Baby (produced 1916)
 1918: The Queen of the Stock Exchange (produced 1916)
 1919: So Ends My Song
 1919: Intoxication
 1919: Towards the Light
 1919: According to Law
 1920: The Merry-Go-Round
 1920: Helmsman Holk
 1920: Kurfürstendamm (eng. Prince Elector Embankment; Note: "Kurfürstendamm" is the name of a famous street in Berlin, Germany.)
 1921: Hamlet: The Drama of Vengeance
 1921: Roswolsky's Mistress
 1921: Wandering Souls
 1922: Miss Julie
 1922: Brigantenrache (eng. Brigand's Revenge)
 1922: Vanina
 1922: Navarro the Dancer
 1923: Earth Spirit
 1923: Downfall
 1923: I.N.R.I.
 1924: The House by the Sea
 1924: Joyless Street
 1924: The Woman in Flames
 1924: Athletes
 1925: Hedda Gabler
 1925: Living Buddhas (produced 1923–1924)
 1925: Joyless Street
 1926: The Fallen
 1927: Laster der Menschheit (eng. Mankind's Vices)
 1927: Tragedy of the Street
 1927: Agitated Women
 1927: Small Town Sinners
 1927: That Dangerous Age
 1932: Impossible Love

Notes

References

External links 

 
 FemBiography
 
 Photographs and literature
 

1881 births
1972 deaths
Danish stage actresses
Danish silent film actresses
Danish film actresses
20th-century Danish actresses
Burials at Vestre Cemetery, Copenhagen